Sri Lanka Super League, is the men's professional top tier football league in Sri Lankan football league system, It is organised by the Football Sri Lanka.

The league comprises 10 clubs. Each season of the tournament generally runs from April to September. Each club plays the others twice (a double round-robin system), for a total of 90 games.

The competition formed as the Sri Lanka Super League in 2018 by the General Secretary of Football Federation of Sri Lanka Jaswar Umar Lebbe with the assistance and guidance of FIFA. It succeeds the Sri Lanka Champions League as the country's top tier football competition.

History
Professionalism in Sri Lanka did not exist until the General Secretary of Football Federation of Sri Lanka Jaswar Umar Lebbe initiated and designed this competition with the assistance and guidance of FIFA in 2018. Club selection process was through a “Club Licensing Criteria” in association with the Asian Football Confederation.

Since most of the clubs in this league haven't any FIFA Standard Stadiums, Sugathadasa Stadium was chosen as the venue to stage the tournament since the beginning.

Competition format
There are 10 clubs in the Super League. During the course of a season each club plays the others twice (a double round-robin system), for a total of 90 games. Teams receive three points for a win and one point for a draw. No points are awarded for a loss. Teams are ranked by total points, then goal difference, and then goals scored. If still equal, teams are deemed to occupy the same position. The competition will operate without promotion and relegation for the first two seasons. 

Due to the COVID-19 situation, inaugural season of the Super League was forced to limit to a single round-robin system.

Qualification for Asian competitions
The winner of the Super League enters the AFC Cup at the qualifying play-offs preliminary round 1 for the South Asia Zone.

Clubs 
The following 10 clubs compete in the Sri Lanka Super League during the 2021 season.

a: Founding member of Sri Lanka Super League
b: Never been relegated from Sri Lanka Super League

Sponsorship 
   Nivia Sports (Official match ball)

Finance
The Football Sri Lanka guaranteed financial support to all the teams in the Super League according to their league positions.

As of 2021, the fixed amount of prize money paid to the clubs are as follows:
 Champions: LKR 5,000,000
 2nd: LKR 3,500,000
 3rd: LKR 2,750,000
 4th: LKR 2,500,000
 5th: LKR 2,250,000
 6th: LKR 2,000,000
 7th: LKR 1,750,000
 8th: LKR 1,500,000
 9th: LKR 1,250,000
 10th: LKR 1,000,000

Media coverage
The Football Sri Lanka announced that TV 1 as the official media partner to broadcast all live matches across Sri Lanka. The football association's own YouTube channel Football Srilanka TV will allow fans abroad to watch the Super League live.

References

External links
League at FIFA
League at soccerway.com

 
1
Top level football leagues in Asia
Sports leagues established in 2021
2021 establishments in Sri Lanka